Antonia Bratu (born 7 October 2004) is a Romanian footballer who plays as a defender for Olimpia Cluj and the Romania women's national team.

Career
She made her debut for the Romania national team on 23 October 2020 against Lithuania, coming on as a substitute for Andrea Herczeg.

References

2004 births
Living people
Women's association football defenders
Romanian women's footballers
Romania women's international footballers
FCU Olimpia Cluj players
Sportspeople from Cluj-Napoca